Brims may refer to:

People
 Harriett Brims (1864-1939), Australian pioneer photographer
 Robin Brims (born 1951), British Army officer

Places
 Brims, Caithness, the location of Brims Castle, Scotland
 Brims, Orkney, Scotland
 Brims or Brniště, Czech Republic

Other uses 
 Brim (hat), projection of stiff material from the bottom of a hat's crown
 Bream or brim, several species of freshwater and marine

See also
 Brim (disambiguation)